Gonzalo Valenzuela (born 26 January 1978) is a Chilean actor. He debuted on Televisión Nacional de Chile with a small guest appearance, after which he moved to Canal 13, where he further developed his TV career. He also starred in Argentine telenovelas. In 2013, he returned to Televisión Nacional to star in the telenovela Socias. He is partner and founder, along with Benjamin Vicuña, of the Centro Cultural Mori of the city of Santiago.

Filmography

Film

Television

References

External links
 

1978 births
Living people
21st-century Chilean male actors
Chilean male telenovela actors
Chilean male television actors
Male actors from Santiago